Emily Webb may refer to:

Emily Webb, character in the 1938 play Our Town by Thornton Wilder and adaptations:
Our Town (1940 film)
Our Town (Producer's Showcase), 1955
Our Town (2003 film)
Our Town (opera), 2006
Emily Webb, character in the 2011 book Vesper (novel)

See also
Emily (disambiguation)
Webb (disambiguation)